Fordham University is a private, Roman Catholic research university located in New York City, New York, United States. Founded in 1841, it is the oldest Catholic institution of higher education in the northeastern United States, the third-oldest university in the state of New York, and the only Jesuit university in New York City. Since its establishment  as St. John's College, the university has been home to multiple colleges and schools, some of which are defunct or have gone through changes in name. As of 2017, Fordham is composed of a total of four undergraduate and six constitutive graduate schools, situated across three campuses in southern New York State, with its two main campuses in New York City: Rose Hill in The Bronx, and Lincoln Center in Manhattan.

As of 2017, Fordham claims over 183,500 alumni throughout the world. Numerous U.S. and international politicians are counted among Fordham's alumni body, including Central Intelligence Directors William J. Casey and John O. Brennan, U.S. Attorney General John N. Mitchell, various governors, and a head of state: Hage Geingob, President of Namibia Anne M. Mulcahy, Chairperson and CEO of Xerox, Wellington Mara (owner of the New York Giants), and billionaire entrepreneurs Eugene Shvidler and Lorenzo Mendoza are alumni. As a Jesuit institution, the university claims numerous Roman Catholic clergy, including Álvaro Corrada del Río, Bishop of the Puerto Rican Diocese; Francis Spellman, cardinal and archbishop of New York; and James Massa, the first African American archbishop in North America.

Fordham has numerous alumni in the entertainment industry. Emmy Award-winning actor Alan Alda; in film, Academy Award-winner Denzel Washington and nominee Patricia Clarkson; and in theater, Tony winners John Benjamin Hickey, Robert Sean Leonard, and Julie White; are alumni. Voice Actor and Comedian Bill Lobley graduated Fordham as well.  Brit Award-winning singer-songwriter Lana Del Rey is an alumna, as well as writers Mary Higgins Clark and Don DeLillo. Football players and coaches Vince Lombardi and Peter Carlesimo are alumni, as well as two-time Olympic gold medal-winning track runner Tom Courtney.  Stage, film, and television actor Dylan McDermott, graduated from Fordham College at Lincoln Center in 1983 and is best known for his roles on stage in Biloxi Blues, in the television shows The Practice, American Horror Story and films Steel Magnolias, In the Line of Fire, and in 2018 The Clovehitch Killer.

Legend 
Notes and abbreviations used
 Individuals who may belong in multiple sections appear only in one. 
 An empty class year or school/degree box indicates that the information is unknown.
"DNG" indicates the alumnus or alumna attended but did not graduate; year(s) of attendance are included if available.

Colleges and schools
FC – Fordham College
SJC – St. John's College (1841–1907)
GSAS – Graduate School of Arts and Sciences
GE – Graduate School of Education
UGE – Undergraduate School of Education (1916–1967)
GRE – Graduate School of Religion and Religious Education
Law – School of Law 
GSB – Gabelli School of Business  
CBA – formerly College of Business Administration (1920–2005)
GSSS – Graduate School of Social Service  
SCPS – School of Professional and Continuing Studies
MS – School of Medicine (1905–1919)
PHC – School of Pharmacy (1905–1966)
TMC – Thomas More College (women's college, 1964–1972)
MC – Marymount College (consolidated 2002; closed 2005)

Academia

College and university presidents 

Richard Guarasci, longest-serving president of Wagner College
 Robert Kibbee (died 1982), Chancellor of the City University of New York
Hakim Lucas, 13th president of Virginia Union University.
Jay Sexter, former President of Mercy College (New York).

Scholars and professors

Art and literature

Business

Civil society

Clergy

Activism

Entertainment

Film, television, and theater

Music

Government and politics

Heads of state and government

Governors of the United States

United States Executive Branch officials

Cabinet members

Cabinet-level officers

Agency heads and subordinate officers

Dennis Walcott, Chancellor of the New York City Department of Education.

White House staff

Military

Judges

United States congress

U.S. Senators

U.S. Representatives

Other U.S. political figures

International political figures

Law

Media and communications

Royalty

Science and technology

Sports

Bob Berman, Major League Baseball player
 Bryant Dunston (born 1986), American-Armenian basketball player

Miscellaneous

Joel Steinberg (born 1941), attorney convicted of manslaughter

Fictional

See also 
:Category:Fordham University alumni
List of Fordham University School of Law alumni
List of Fordham University faculty
List of Fordham Rams in the NFL Draft

References

Citations

Works cited

External links 

Official university alumni site 
Famous Fordham Alumni at Biography.com

Alumni
 
Fordham University